Emmanuel Chamond (c. 1553 – 1611), of the Middle Temple and St. Giles, Cripplegate, London, was an English politician.

He was a Member (MP) of the Parliament of England for Camelford in 1584, for Bodmin in 1586–7 and 1588–9 and for Newport, Cornwall in 1593.

References

1550s births
1611 deaths
Politicians from London
Members of the Middle Temple
English MPs 1584–1585
English MPs 1586–1587
English MPs 1593
Members of the Parliament of England for Camelford
Members of the Parliament of England for Bodmin
Members of the Parliament of England for Newport (Cornwall)